James Island may refer to:

James Island (Gambia), a World Heritage island in the Gambia
James Island (British Columbia), an island in Haro Strait off Sidney, BC near Vancouver Island
James Island (Galápagos), another name for Santiago Island (Galápagos)
James Island (Maryland), an island in Chesapeake Bay
James Island (South Carolina), an island near Charleston, South Carolina
James Island (San Juan Islands), one of the San Juan Islands in Washington
James Island (Washington), near La Push, Washington
James Island (Chile)
James Island (sanctuary), island of India
James Island, a name for Baffin Island used by 18th-century French cartographers